The 2021 International GT Open was the sixteenth season of the International GT Open, the grand tourer-style sports car racing series founded in 2006 by the Spanish GT Sport Organización. It began on 15 May at Circuit Paul Ricard and endedat the Circuit de Barcelona-Catalunya on 24 October after seven rounds of two races each. This season the GT Cup Open Europe was brought into the International GT Open, meaning the GTC and GT4 cars shared grids with the headlining series.

Entry list

Race calendar and results 

 A seven-round provisional calendar was revealed on 1 December 2020. It represents a return to normalcy after the Coronavirus pandemic forced change in the 2020 season. The only addition on the original from 2020 is the Algarve International Circuit, which had lost its spot in the provisional calendar in 2020 due to scheduling conflicts. Due to the track's late addition to the Formula 1 calendar however, it was forced to be removed from the schedule in 2021 as well and was replaced with the Autodromo Internazionale Enzo e Dino Ferrari. Multiple other tracks had date changes because the pandemic caused the series to start in August rather than the planned April.

Championship standings

Points systems 

Points are awarded to the top 10 (Pro) or top 6 (Am, Pro-Am, Teams) classified finishers. If less than 6 participants start the race or if less than 75% of the original race distance is completed, half points are awarded. At the end of the season, the lowest race score is dropped; however, the dropped race cannot be the result of a disqualification or race ban.

Overall

Pro-Am, Am, and Teams

Drivers' championships

Overall

Pro-Am

Am

Teams' championship 
Only the highest two finishing cars from a team count towards the Teams' Championship

Notes

References

External links 

 

International GT Open
International GT Open seasons